Alafia landolphioides grows as a liana up to  long, with a stem diameter of up to . Its fragrant flowers feature a white corolla, dark red at the throat.

Its habitat is forest and savanna, from sea-level to  altitude. Local medicinal uses include as a treatment for rheumatism.  The plant has been used as arrow poison. Alafia landolphioides grows natively in countries from Senegal in the west through West Africa to the Democratic Republic of Congo.

References

landolphioides
Plants described in 1903
Plants used in traditional African medicine
Flora of West Tropical Africa
Flora of West-Central Tropical Africa